Live at The Savoy, New York October 27, 1981 is a live album by Southern rock band Atlanta Rhythm Section, released in 2000.

Track listing
"Champagne Jam" (Buie, Cobb, Nix) – 5:17
"I'm Not Gonna Let It Bother Me Tonight" (Buie, Daughtry, Nix) – 5:55
"Homesick" (Buie, Cobb) – 4:54
"Alien" (Buie, Lewis, McRay) – 5:51
"Large Time" (Bailey, Buie, Nix) – 3:05
"Spooky" (Buie, Cobb, Middlebrooks, Shapiro) – 5:13
"Higher" (Buie, Hammond) – 5:09
"Imaginary Lover" (Buie, Daughtry, Nix) – 3:39
"So into You" (Buie, Daughtry, Nix) – 6:03
"Long Tall Sally" (Robert Blackwell, Enotris Johnson, Little Richard) – 3:08

Personnel
Barry Bailey – guitar
J.R. Cobb – guitar, vocals
Dean Daughtry – keyboards, vocals
Paul Goddard – bass guitar
Ronnie Hammond – vocals
Roy Yeager – drums

References

Atlanta Rhythm Section live albums
2000 live albums